Andre Petim (born 3 August 1985 in Cape Town, Western Cape) is a South African football (soccer) goalkeeper for Premier Soccer League club Vasco Da Gama. He was born to Portuguese settlers from Madeira.

Career
He started off his career at Vasco Da Gama and started off his Ajax Cape Town career at the age of 15 years, at the age of 19 years he made his 1st team debut. He has represented the South African U23 team and has also played in the African Champions League with Ajax. He was also part of the successful Ajax team that won the ABSA Cup in 2007. Petim also played a big part in the winning of the 2008 Telkom Knockout for Ajax when he saved two penalties in the 1st round and had a fantastic game in the final and was also a nominee for goalkeeper of the tournament.

He is currently the Head Goalkeeper Coach at Ajax Cape Town.

References

1985 births
South African soccer players
Association football goalkeepers
Living people
Cape Town Spurs F.C. players
Lamontville Golden Arrows F.C. players
South African people of Portuguese descent
People of Madeiran descent
Sportspeople from Cape Town
White South African people
Vasco da Gama (South Africa) players